Icarian can refer to:
The Icarians, a utopian movement
Icarian: Kindred Spirits, a video game
Icarians, fictional beings in the first game of Grandia series
People and things from Icaria, a Greek island